PlaceSpotting is an online game, based on Google Maps. Its server is based in Switzerland and has English- and German-language versions. In international Media, PlaceSpotting is recommended as a "challenging amusement" and an "educational way of wasting time on the internet".

Overview

The way PlaceSpotting works is simple:
To create a new quiz, move and zoom the map until it shows an interesting place. Provide some hints for the person who will try to solve it and a message one will see if the riddle is solved. After saving the quiz you can send it by mail to a friend or embed it in your homepage as a picture. 
If someone wants to solve the quiz their task is to find the place shown in your picture on a second google map. The site additionally has a blog to share questions or hints, a search function, and the possibility to rate quizzes.
Players are scoring an approximate 11% success rate.
In the first 30 months after going live approximately 3.3 Million quizzes were opened and 20,000 created.
PlaceSpotting is free and can be played without registration. A registration is possible and allows to use special functions like "my quizeees" or "quizzes I solved"
There are some Google Adwords on the page.

Development
PlaceSpotting was developed for people who used email communication to send their friends screen shots of interesting places and wanted them to guess what place was shown in the picture.

Different platforms

Beside the web page PlaceSpotting can be played as a Facebook Application or as an iPhone App
The iPhone Application was released 4 October 2009. A free version is planned. The application received the award App of the week in December 2009 in Switzerland.

Community
PlaceSpotting is present on Facebook and StudiVZ and on YouTube is a short Video about how to play PlaceSpotting.

See also
 Indoor positioning system

External links
placeSpotting.com

Media coverage
Story in German magazine, Heise online
A story in the Swiss online magazine 20minuten.ch 
An article in the Swedish online newspaper Metropol
An article on the page of Deutschlandradio

References

2009 video games
Online games
Google Maps